The Potato virus X cis-acting regulatory element is a cis-acting regulatory element found in the 3' UTR of the Potato virus X genome. This element has been found to be required for minus strand RNA accumulation and is essential for efficient viral replication.

See also 
Poxvirus AX element late mRNA cis-regulatory element

References

External links 
 

Cis-regulatory RNA elements